Yahor Shchalkanau (born 11 June 2001 in Brest) is a Belarusian Paralympic swimmer. He won a silver medal in the 100 m breaststroke S9 event at the 2020 Summer Paralympics.

References

2001 births
Living people
Sportspeople from Brest, Belarus
Paralympic swimmers of Belarus
Swimmers at the 2020 Summer Paralympics
Medalists at the 2020 Summer Paralympics
Medalists at the World Para Swimming European Championships
Paralympic silver medalists for Belarus
Paralympic medalists in swimming
Belarusian male swimmers
S9-classified Paralympic swimmers